Finger knitting is a form of knitting where a knitted cord is created using only hands and fingers, instead of knitting needles or other traditional tools.

Uses
Though finger knitting may be performed by people of all ages, it is cited as a teaching tool for children because of its comparative simplicity in contrast to traditional knitting. It effectively demonstrates that knitting involves a series of loops strung together. Finger knitting may also be safely practised on aeroplanes that prohibit knitting needles.

Records
Several world record attempts have been made with finger knitting. The current record, as acknowledged by the Guinness Book of World Records, is held by a German man who knitted a  strand in 2004.

References

External links 
 Finger knitting by Lisa Pidgeon, Little Bird School of Stitchcraft
 Wandering Henry - finger knitting in story form, from CraftSanity
 How to Finger Weave
 How to Finger Knit (WikiHow)

Knitting